Abraham was an early 13th-century Scottish cleric who held the position of Bishop of Dunblane. He was a chaplain to the Mormaer of Strathearn, Gille Brígte.

There are no exact accounts of his origin, but his name and the background suggest he was a native Scot from Strathearn. There is no evidence to the contrary. Neville wrote that his "Hebrew name conceals an English provenance", but in fact the Hebrew name is more consistent with established Gaelic-naming patterns than with English or French ones.

He was a son of a priest, and had at least one son of his own, Arthur by name. Evidence from the charters of Inchaffray Abbey shows that he was bishop-elect by some date between the years 1210 and 1214.

A charter from Arbroath Abbey shows he had been consecrated by 4 December 1214. The date of his death is not known, but Radulf was bishop-elect in an Arbroath document datable between 1223 and 1225.

Notes

References

 Clancy, Thomas Owen, "Scotland, the ‘Nennian’ Recension of the Historia Brittonum, and the Lebor Bretnach", in Simon Taylor (ed.), Kings, Clerics and Chronicles in Scotland, 500–1297, (Portland, 2000), pp. 87–107
 Cockburn, James Hutchison, The Medieval Bishops of Dunblane and Their Church, (Edinburgh, 1959)
 Lindsay, William Alexander, Dowden, John, and Thomson, John Maitland, (eds.), Charters, Bulls and Other Documents relating to the Abbey of Inchaffray Chiefly from the Originals in the Charter Chest of the Earl of Kinnoull, (Publications of the Scottish History Society, vol. 56, 1908)
 Neville, Cynthia J., Native Lordship in Medieval Scotland: The Earldoms of Strathearn and Lennox, c. 1140–1365, (Dublin, 2005)
 Theiner, Augustin, Vetera monumenta Hibernorum et Scotorum historiam illustrantia, quae ex Vaticani Neapolis ac Florentiae, (Rome, 1864)
 Watt, D. E. R., Fasti Ecclesiae Scoticanae Medii Aevi ad annum 1638, 2nd Draft, (St Andrews, 1969)

12th-century births
1220s deaths
Bishops of Dunblane
Medieval Gaels from Scotland
13th-century Scottish Roman Catholic bishops